Bernardo de Albuquerque, O.P. (died 23 July 1579) was a Roman Catholic prelate who served as Bishop of Antequera, Oaxaca (1561–1579).

Biography
Bernardo de Albuquerque was ordained a priest in the Order of Preachers.
On 27 June 1561, he was selected by the King of Spain and confirmed by Pope Pius IV as Bishop of Antequera, Oaxaca. On 8 November 1562, he was consecrated bishop by Alonso de Montúfar, Archbishop of México with Vasco de Quiroga, Bishop of Michoacán, and Fernando de Villagómez, Bishop of Tlaxcala, as co-consecrators. He served as Bishop of Antequera, Oaxaca until his death on 23 July 1579. In the year 1561, Bernardo de Albuquerque saw fit to destroy Mitla and exile most of its inhabitants, specifically the indigenous religious practitioners.

References

External links and additional sources
 (for Chronology of Bishops) 
 (for Chronology of Bishops) 
 

1579 deaths
16th-century Roman Catholic bishops in Mexico
Bishops appointed by Pope Pius IV
Dominican bishops
People from the Province of Badajoz